Naat and similar may refer to:

National Archery Association of Thailand, The archery government of Thailand
Na`at (Arabic: نعت), poetry that specifically praises the Islamic prophet Muhammad
NAAT, Nucleic Acid Amplification Test, a biochemical technique used to detect a virus or a bacterium
Na`at (village), a village in Yemen
Naat, a fictional island featured in Clark Ashton Smith's Zothique stories.